The Heracleidae or Heraclids  were the numerous descendants of Heracles (Hercules), especially applied in a narrower sense to the descendants of Hyllus, the eldest of his four sons by Deianira (Hyllus was also sometimes thought of as Heracles' son by Melite). Other Heracleidae included Macaria, Lamos, Manto, Bianor, Tlepolemus, and Telephus. These Heraclids were a group of Dorian kings who conquered the Peloponnesian kingdoms of Mycenae, Sparta and Argos; according to the literary tradition in Greek mythology, they claimed a right to rule through their ancestor.  Since Karl Otfried Müller's Die Dorier (1830, English translation 1839), I. ch. 3, their rise to dominance has been associated with a "Dorian invasion". Though details of genealogy differ from one ancient author to another, the cultural significance of the mythic theme, that the descendants of Heracles, exiled after his death, returned some generations later to reclaim land that their ancestors had held in Mycenaean Greece, was to assert the primal legitimacy of a traditional ruling clan that traced its origin, thus its legitimacy, to Heracles 

In the historical period, several dynasties claimed descent from Heracles, such as the Agiads and Eurypontids of Sparta, or the Temenids of Macedonia.

Origin
Heracles, whom Zeus had originally intended to be ruler of Argos, Lacedaemon and Messenian Pylos, had been supplanted by the cunning of Hera, and his intended possessions had fallen into the hands of Eurystheus, king of Mycenae. After the death of Heracles, his children, after many wanderings, found refuge from Eurystheus at Athens. Eurystheus, on his demand for their surrender being refused, attacked Athens, but was defeated and slain. Hyllus and his brothers then invaded Peloponnesus, but after a year's stay were forced by a pestilence to quit. They withdrew to Thessaly, where Aegimius, the mythical ancestor of the Dorians, whom Heracles had assisted in war against the Lapithae, adopted Hyllus and made over to him a third part of his territory.

After the death of Aegimius, his two sons, Pamphylus and Dymas, voluntarily submitted to Hyllus (who was, according to the Dorian tradition in Herodotus V. 72, really an Achaean), who thus became ruler of the Dorians, the three branches of that race being named after these three heroes. Desiring to reconquer his paternal inheritance, Hyllus consulted the Delphic oracle, which told him to wait for "the third fruit", (or "the third crop") and then enter Peloponnesus by "a narrow passage by sea". Accordingly, after three years, Hyllus marched across the isthmus of Corinth to attack Atreus, the successor of Eurystheus, but was slain in single combat by Echemus, king of Tegea. This second attempt was followed by a third under Cleodaeus and a fourth under Aristomachus, both unsuccessful.

Dorian invasion

At last, Temenus, Cresphontes and Aristodemus, the sons of Aristomachus, complained to the oracle that its instructions had proved fatal to those who had followed them. They received the answer that by the "third fruit" the "third generation" was meant, and that the "narrow passage" was not the isthmus of Corinth, but the straits of Rhium. They accordingly built a fleet at Naupactus, but before they set sail, Aristodemus was struck by lightning (or shot by Apollo) and the fleet destroyed, because one of the Heracleidae had slain an Acarnanian soothsayer.

The oracle, being again consulted by Temenus, bade him offer an expiatory sacrifice and banish the murderer for ten years, and look out for a man with three eyes to act as guide. On his way back to Naupactus, Temenus fell in with Oxylus, an Aetolian, who had lost one eye, riding on a horse (thus making up the three eyes) and immediately pressed him into his service. According to another account, a mule on which Oxylus rode had lost an eye. The Heracleidae repaired their ships, sailed from Naupactus to Antirrhium, and thence to Rhium in Peloponnesus. A decisive battle was fought with Tisamenus, son of Orestes, the chief ruler in the peninsula, who was defeated and slain.  This conquest was traditionally dated eighty years after the Trojan War.

The Heracleidae, who thus became practically masters of Peloponnesus, proceeded to distribute its territory among themselves by lot. Argos fell to Temenus, Lacedaemon to Procles and Eurysthenes, the twin sons of Aristodemus; and Messenia to Cresphontes (tradition maintains that Cresphontes cheated in order to obtain Messenia, which had the best land of all.) The fertile district of Elis had been reserved by agreement for Oxylus. The Heracleidae ruled in Lacedaemon until 221 BCE, but disappeared much earlier in the other countries.

This conquest of Peloponnesus by the Dorians, commonly called the "Dorian invasion" or the "Return of the Heraclidae", is represented as the recovery by the descendants of Heracles of the rightful inheritance of their hero ancestor and his sons. The Dorians followed the custom of other Greek tribes in claiming as ancestor for their ruling families one of the legendary heroes, but the traditions must not on that account be regarded as entirely mythical. They represent a joint invasion of Peloponnesus by Aetolians and Dorians, the latter having been driven southward from their original northern home under pressure from the Thessalians. It is noticeable that there is no mention of these Heraclidae or their invasion in Homer or Hesiod. Herodotus (vi. 52) speaks of poets who had celebrated their deeds, but these were limited to events immediately succeeding the death of Heracles.

List of Heracleidae

At Sparta

At Sparta, the Heraclids formed two dynasties ruling jointly: the Agiads and the Eurypontids. Other Spartiates also claimed Heraclid descent, such as Lysander.

At Corinth
At Corinth the Heraclids ruled as the Bacchiadae dynasty before the aristocratic revolution, which brought a Bacchiad aristocracy into power.

At Argos 

A descendent of Heracles, Temenus, was the first king of Argos, who later counted the famous tyrant Pheidon.

At Macedonia
At Macedonia, the Heraclids formed the Argead Dynasty, whose name comes from Argos, as one of the Heraclids from this city, Perdiccas I, settled in Macedonia, where he founded his kingdom. By the time of Philip II the family had expanded their reign further, to include under the rule of Macedonia all Upper Macedonian states. Their most celebrated members were Philip II of Macedon and his son Alexander the Great, under whose leadership the kingdom of Macedonia gradually gained predominance throughout Greece, defeated the Achaemenid Empire and expanded as far as Egypt and India. The mythical founder of the Argead dynasty is King Caranus.

In Euripides' tragedy

The Greek tragedians amplified the story, probably drawing inspiration from local legends which glorified the services rendered by Athens to the rulers of Peloponnesus.

The Heracleidae feature as the main subjects of Euripides' play, Heracleidae. J. A. Spranger found the political subtext of Heracleidae, never far to seek, so particularly apt in Athens towards the end of the peace of Nicias, in 419 BCE, that he suggested the date as that of the play's first performance.

In the tragedy, Iolaus, Heracles' old comrade and nephew, and Heracles' children, Macaria and her brothers and sisters have hidden from Eurystheus in Athens, ruled by King Demophon; as the first scene makes clear, they expect that the blood relationship of the kings with Heracles and their father's past indebtedness to Theseus will finally provide them sanctuary. As Eurystheus prepares to attack, an oracle tells Demophon that only the sacrifice of a noble woman to Persephone can guarantee an Athenian victory. Macaria volunteers for the sacrifice and a spring is named the Macarian spring in her honor.

References

Sources 
 Bibliotheca ii. 8
 Diodorus Siculus iv. 57, 58
 Pausanias i. 32, 41, ii. 13, 18, iii. I, iv. 3, v. 3
 Euripides, Heracleidae
 Pindar, Pythia, ix. 137
 Herodotus ix. 27
 Connop Thirlwall, History of Greece, ch. vii
 George Grote, History of Greece, pt. i. ch. xviii
 Georg Busolt, Griechische Geschichte, i. ch. ii. sec. 7, where a list of modern authorities is given

External links
 Article by George Hinge
 Greek Mythology Links
 Timeless Mythology
 Article about Dorian Invasion

 
Dorians
Iron Age Greece
Mycenaean Greece
Patronymics from Greek mythology